Bodianus prognathus is a species of wrasse. It is found in the Eastern Central Pacific Ocean.

Size

References

Fish of the Pacific Ocean
prognathus
Taxa named by Phillip S. Lobel
Fish described in 1981